The DerzhPlan of the Ukrainian SSR or State Planning Committee of the Ukrainian SSR was a union-republican authority that conducted state planning of economical and social development of the Ukrainian SSR and controlled execution of national economical plans.

The committee was created on September 28, 1921 as the Ukrainian Commonly-planned Economic Commission as part of the Ukrainian Economical Conference. Later it was subordinated to the Council of People's Commissars (since 1946 - Council of Ministers) of the Ukrainian SSR and the Gosplan (until 1922 - of the Russian SFSR) of the USSR. The base of its organization and activities was the principle of democratic centralism.

Purpose
Derzhplan was developing perspective and annual state plans of economical and social development of the Ukrainian SSR in accordance with program of the Communist Party of the Soviet Union, statements of the party's congresses and the Communist Party of Ukraine, decisions of the Central Committee of the Communist Party of the Soviet Union and the Council of Ministers of the USSR, the Central Committee of Communist Party of Ukraine and Council of Ministers of the Ukrainian SSR and instructions of the Gosplan of the USSR. The plans ensure a proportional development of national economy of the republic, a continuous growth and increase efficiency of public production, a rapid growth of national income, a further scientific-technical progress and a labor productivity growth. Those plans also provide a rational use of based funds and production capacities, material, labor, natural and financial resources, improving product quality, specialization of economy of the Ukrainian SSR in the All-Union division of labor in order to increase contribution in creation of the material-technical base of communism, steady increase of the living standards of the people. Developing plans, the committee provides a rational allocation of productive forces on a territory of the republic based on specialization and cooperation in production and integrated development of regional economies and economic districts.

Chairman of Derzhplan
Unlike the rest of members of the committee who were elected by the Council of Ministers, the chairman of Derzhplan was appointed by the Central Executive Committee of the Ukrainian SSR (since 1937 - Verkhovna Rada).

 November 1922 - November 1923 Hryhoriy Hrynko
 1923 - 1924 Mikhail Vladimirsky
 June 1925 - December 1926 Hryhoriy Hrynko
 1926 - 1933 Yakym Dudnyk
 February 1933 - July 7, 1933 Mykola Skrypnyk
 1933 - November 1934 Yuri Kotsyubynsky
 1935 - May 1938 Kyrylo Sukhomlyn
 July 1938 - May 28, 1940 Oleksiy Usykov
 May 28, 1940 - 1941 Anatoliy Baranovsky
 1943 - 1950 Volodymyr Valuyev
 1950 - 1952 Vasyl Harbuzov
 1954 - 1957 Anatoliy Baranovsky
 1957 - 1959 Ivan Senin
 1959 - 1963 Petro Rozenko
 March 1963 - December 14, 1966 Anton Kochubei
 1966 - 1967 I.Starovoitenko
 March 1967 - 1979 Petro Rozenko
 January 1979 - July 1987 Vitaliy Masol
 July 1987 - 1990 Vitold Fokin

See also
 Ministry of Economic Development and Trade (Ukraine), successor of the committee

Further reading
 Lortikyan, E. Development of socialist planning in transitional period from capitalism to socialism. Kiev 1962.
 Kochubei, A. Planning and economic management on the modern stage. Kiev 1963.
 Urinson, M. Planning of national economy in the union republics. Moscow, 1963.

External links
 Rozenko, P. State Planning Committee of the Ukrainian SSR. "Ukrainian Soviet Encyclopedia".
 Statement of the Council of Ministers of the Ukrainian SSR on Derzhplan
 Movchan, O. State Planning Committee at the Council of Ministers of the Ukrainian SSR. Encyclopedia of History of Ukraine. "Naukova dumka". Kiev, 2004.
 Decision of Council of Ministers of the Ukrainian SSR. On transformation of Derzhplan structure. August 9, 1988.
 Decision of Council of Ministers of the Ukrainian SSR. On approval of regulations about the Derzhplan. November 16, 1982.

Soviet phraseology
Economy of the Soviet Union
State Committees of the Soviet Union
Economic planning
1921 establishments in Ukraine
Government of the Ukrainian Soviet Socialist Republic
1990 disestablishments in Ukraine